Inheritance of Hope is a nonprofit charity that inspires hope in young families facing the loss of a parent. Through retreat programs, monthly support groups, and resources, Inheritance of Hope helps families navigate the challenges of a parent's terminal illness. Inheritance of Hope was founded by Kristen and Deric Milligan and rose from their efforts to deal with raising three young children during Kristen's battle with liver cancer.

Story 
The Inheritance of Hope story began with one young family facing a parent’s terminal illness – a mom and dad with young children looking for resources for their entire family as they all navigated the mom’s illness. Surprisingly, there were none. They decided to create resources for their family and share them with others.

In 2007, Deric and Kristen Milligan launched IoH with the mission to inspire hope in young families facing the loss of a parent, and the brand has grown to serve families throughout the U.S.

Background
Inheritance of Hope was founded by Deric and Kristen Milligan following several years of coping with the challenges of raising three young children while battling a terminal illness. The concept was born in 2003 after Kristen, then 30, was diagnosed with a rare terminal liver cancer and had difficulty finding literature to help her three young children (ages 4, 2, and 7 months) through this challenging time. She decided to remedy the problem and wrote her first book, A Train’s Rust, A Toy Maker’s Love, to help her children better understand what was happening in their family.

Six surgeries, two radiation treatments, two rounds of chemotherapy, and three books later, Kristen and her husband Deric expanded the concept by co-founding Inheritance of Hope, a 501(c)(3) nonprofit charity devoted to inspiring hope in young families facing the loss of a parent. Sadly, Kristen lost her courageous bout with cancer in 2012, but her legacy remains as the organization serves families like her own.

Programs
Inheritance of Hope is a hope-filled community of care that serves families in 3 life-changing ways:
 ON-SITE: Legacy Retreats®, destination experience where families create lifelong memories and receive the tools to navigate the challenges of terminal illness
 ONLINE: Hope@Home™ Weekend, memory-making event where your family can connect with other families who “get it” -- all from the comfort of home
 ON-GOING: Hope@Home™ Groups, monthly groups for all ages to gain resources and connect in community with people who understand their situation
Inheritance of Hope welcomes families of all faiths and backgrounds while serving under the core beliefs of the Christian faith.

Team Inheritance of Hope 
Team Inheritance of Hope (Team IoH) is a group of athletes who represent Inheritance of Hope at various events to raise awareness of Inheritance of Hope's activities. Team IoH runners have participated in many events, including the TCS NYC Marathon, the Marine Corps Marathon, Volley for the Cure, Big Sur Marathon, and the NYC Half Marathon.

Awards 
On May 24, 2016, Co-Founder & CEO, Deric Milligan, was recognized by "the one hundred," an organization by the Mass General Cancer Center that recognizes 100 everyday amazing groups and individuals who are changing how we fight cancer.

On June 5, 2015, Co-Founder Kristen Milligan, posthumously received the John W. Kuykendall Award for Community Service.  The award recognizes Davidson College alumni who have provided extraordinary service to their community, demonstrating leadership through servanthood.

On May 9, 2015,  the National Ethnic Coalition of Organizations (NECO) presented the 29th annual Ellis Island Medals of Honor ceremony on Ellis Island in New York City.  Inheritance of Hope Co-Founder and CEO, Deric Milligan, was honored as a 2015 recipient for his dedication serving families facing the loss of a parent.
Other notable guests included Jay Baker (President, Kohls), Edward Creagan (Mayo Clinic), Richard Gelfond (CEO, IMAX), Howard Lutnick (CEO, Cantor Fitzgerald), Sandra Day O’Connor (Supreme Court Justice), Mariano Rivera (NY Yankees), Frank Shankwitz (Founder, Make-a-Wish), and Meredith Vieira (TV personality).

In March 2015, Co-Founder, Kristen Milligan, was posthumously inducted into the Harrison School for the Arts Hall of Fame for her demonstrated leadership, creativity, and innovation in many ways, most notably in her approach to a terminal diagnosis.

In May 2014, Inheritance of Hope was recognized as a "Top 10 Children's Charity" by Theravive, a network of licensed therapists and psychologists.

Since 2011, Inheritance of Hope has earned a "Top-Rated" rating from GreatNonProfits.org.

References

External links 
 
Children's charities based in the United States
Non-profit organizations based in South Carolina
2007 establishments in South Carolina